Steneretma is a genus of picture-winged flies in the family Ulidiidae.

Species
 S. laticauda

References

Ulidiidae